The 2018 Gwangju Open was a professional tennis tournament played on hard courts. It was the 3rd edition of the tournament which was part of the 2018 ATP Challenger Tour. It took place in Gwangju, South Korea between 13 and 19 August 2018.

Singles main-draw entrants

Seeds

 1 Rankings as of 6 August 2018.

Other entrants
The following players received wildcards into the singles main draw:
  Chung Hong
  Jeong Yeong-seok
  Kim Cheong-eui
  Sin Dong-hak

The following player received entry into the singles main draw as an alternate:
  Marcel Granollers

The following player received entry into the singles main draw as a special exempt:
  Xia Zihao

The following players received entry from the qualifying draw:
  He Yecong
  Nam Ji-sung
  Sidharth Rawat
  Son Ji-hoon

Champions

Singles

  Maverick Banes def.  Nam Ji-sung 6–3, 4–6, 6–4.

Doubles

  Nam Ji-sung /  Song Min-kyu def.  Benjamin Lock /  Rubin Statham 5–7, 6–3, [10–5].

References

2018 ATP Challenger Tour
2018 in South Korean tennis
Gwangju Open